The Regional Command of the Arab Socialist Ba'ath Party – Iraq Region, officially the Regional Command of the Iraqi Regional Branch of the Arab Socialist Ba'ath Party, was the highest decision-making organ of the Iraqi Regional Branch. The Regional Command has normally had 19-21 members throughout its history. When in power, the Directorate of Security Affairs was responsible for the security of the president and the senior members of the Regional Command.

The Iraqi Regional Branch was organized on the Marxist–Leninist model, with a small elite, the Regional Command, controlling the party from the top down. As in the Soviet Union, the party leadership became the government. While the Regional Command was the de facto highest legislative and executive organ of state and party, the Revolutionary Command Council was according to the 1970 Iraqi constitution "the supreme body of the state." In theory, the Regional Command was to be subordinate to the National Command.

Structure

Secretary of the Regional Command
 Fuad al-Rikabi (1951–1959)
 Talib Hussein ash-Shabibi (1959– May 1962)
 Ali Salih al-Sadi (May 1962 – 25 September 1963)
 Hamdi Abd al-Majid (25 September 1963 – 11 November 1963)
 Ahmed Hassan al-Bakr (11 November 1963 – February 1964)
 Saddam Hussein (February 1964 – 1966)
 Ahmed Hassan al-Bakr (1966–1979)
 Saddam Hussein (1979–2003 de facto, 2003–2006 de jure)
 Izzat Ibrahim al-Douri (2007–2020)
 Mohammed Younis al-Ahmed (2020–present)
Deputy Secretary of the Regional Command
 Unknown (pre-1966)
 Saddam Hussein (1966–1979)
 Taha Yassin Ramadan (1979–1991)
 Izzat Ibrahim al-Douri (1991–2007)
 Unknown (2007–present)

Members

References
General
Regional Command membership was taken from this source:
  
Specific

Bibliography

 
 
 
 

.1
Organizations established in 1955
Executive committees of political parties